The Saab 9000 is an automobile produced by the Swedish company Saab from 1984 to 1998. Representing the company's foray into the executive car scene, it was developed as a result of the successes of the turbocharged 99 and 900 models. The 9000 remained in production until May 1998 and it was replaced by the Saab 9-5 in late 1997, although some final cars were produced into 1998. The Saab 9000 was only available with petrol engines, as 5-door hatchback or 4-door notchback and never as a convertible (except for one prototype) or a Coupé.

Saab designed the 9000 as part of the Type Four platform in conjunction with the Italian automaker Fiat Automobiles. Fiat retailed similar derivative versions as the more basic Fiat Croma, the luxury-themed Lancia Thema, and the sports-oriented Alfa Romeo 164. Unlike the 164, which shares only the chassis, the Croma and Thema are outwardly similar to the 9000. As such, much of the bodywork appeared interchangeable between the 9000, Croma and Thema; for example, the doors. However, because Saab fitted heavier side impact protection they will not fit. Also the front of the Saab is radically different from the Italian siblings due to the much improved crash protection. Only seven parts are actually interchangeable. The 9000's body was designed by Giorgetto Giugiaro and Saab designer Björn Envall.

Despite being shorter overall than the 900 which was still produced in parallel, the 9000 has a longer wheelbase and greater interior space with 123-cu.ft. of interior space (23.5-cu.ft. in the trunk, 56.5-cu.ft. with rear seats folded), qualifying as an EPA-rated “large car", a distinction shared only with the contemporary Rolls-Royce in America. This was achieved by installing the engine transversely to the direction of travel in the Saab 9000 (instead longitudinally as in the Saab 900). Unlike the 900 the 9000 kept the ignition switch in the more conventional steering column position rather than between the front seats. The inspiration for the seats was taken by Björn Envall from The Muppet Show's Pigs in Space, a sketch by the late puppeteer Jim Henson.

In total, 503,087 Saab 9000s were manufactured.
These are divided into:
216,385 Saab 9000 CC (MY 1985-1991)
174,525 Saab 9000 CS (MY 1992-1998)
112,177 Saab 9000 CD (MY 1988-1997)

History 

The 9000 was launched to the motoring press at a conference at Kolmården Game Park on 24 May 1984 and 1985 in the European market. This original model called "Saab 9000 Turbo 16" and was a five-door liftback, only available with manual gearbox and the 2.0 turbo engine with 16 valves (producing 129 kw/173 hp DIN without cat and already known from the Saab 900). Drag resistance for the original model is Cd 0.34, very competitive for the time.

The Saab 9000 was awarded Best Prestige Car 1985 by the French magazine L’Action Automobile.

At the end of 1985 (with cars of MY 1986) the 9000 was rolled out (with the 2.0 Turbo and an exhaust gas purification via catalytic converter, producing 118 kw/160 hp DIN) in the most important foreign market for Saab: the US. Saab also introduced during the model year at all markets the fuel injected non-turbo engine for the Saab 9000 (producing 125 hp DIN with catalytic converter, 128 hp DIN without), based on the same engine as the turbo version and with four valves per cylinder, electronic ignition and a knock sensor.

In the autumn of 1986, Saab organised a record attempt with the Saab 9000, which received much attention in the US and internationally, at the Alabama International Motor Speedway at Talladega, now the Talladega Superspeedway. "Saab Turbo--In The Long Run" took place over 20 days and 20 nights. "The main purpose of the Long Run project is to test the endurance of our cars as part of our ongoing testing program," explained Olle Granlund, head of Saab's engine and transmission department and the person in charge of this project. All three 9000 Turbo 16s passed the 100,000 [KM] mark in 21 days, the lead car breaking 21 international and two world speed records in the process. In memory of this event. Saab was to sell special models under the name "Talladega" in the prospective years, not only for the Saab 9000 but also for other model series. Furthermore, the event was repeated 10 years later in 1996 with models of the "NG 900".

For MY 1987 a modern ZF automatic with four stages became available (and remained the only available automatic version until the end of production). In 1987 for model year 1988, Saab released a 4-door sedan variant of the 9000 known as the CD. The front of the Sedan was different (more modern) and more streamlined than the hatchback version. This involved smoothing the edges of the headlamps and grille, and sloping the front outwards. Saab adapted the design of the sedan to the current facelift of the Saab 900, which had already received a similar new front for the MY 1987. This re-design marked a departure from the more upright front styling of the 1984 original, which was also similar to the old design of the Saab 900 from 1978 to 1986. The fact that the older medium class model Saab 900 had received the facelift first seems curiously, also that the 9000 hatchback 5-door model still retained the old front design. But it can be explained by the fact that in the 1980s the bulk of sales in the US were still through the classic 900.

From 1988, all 9000 variants were equipped with a Saab Information Display (SID) which showed fuel consumption, distance to an empty fuel tank, alternator output voltage, outside temperature, and lowest battery voltage during vehicle start. A separate pictogram monitored door and hatch opening and exterior light bulb condition. 1988 also marked the introduction of pyrotechnic seat belt tensioners for the front seats.

Saab Direct Ignition was also introduced 1988 with the 9000 CD and its B202 turbo engine. The same engine in the CC got the DI with MY 1989. Since then all new engine releases for the 9000 got the DI from beginning (except later V6 which came from GM). The output of both engines increased slightly through optimisations from 160 hp DIN to 163 hp DIN (with catalytic converter) and from 125 hp DIN to 128 hp DIN (with) and from 128 hp DIn to 133 hp DIN (without).

For MY 1990 Saab introduced the new developed larger B234 2.3-litre engine, providing  in the normally aspirated engine. For MY 1991, the B234 became available also with a turbocharger, producing  and an impressive torque. Unlike the other engines, each of which was also used in the classic Saab 900, the B234 was only used in the Saab 9000 (and later in other model series).

For MY 1991 (Europe) and MY 92 (US) Saab also adopted the sloping front of the CD also for the hatchback (CC). With this, the classic flat front of the Saab 90, 99, 900 and the early 9000 was finally over. But this design existed only for this MY on the CC in most markets (the CD notchback kept the old design till MY 1994).

Because the next bigger facelift for the Saab 9000 5-door hatchback was followed by release of a partially redesigned body for the 1992 model year in Europe (for MY 1993 in the US), known as the CS. At the release of the CS, the original liftback variant from MY 1985-1991/1992 was retrospectively designated CC to differentiate it from the newer version. The "old" CC was continued to sell out of stock alongside in some markets as an entry-level model and in particular in the US, where the new CS was not available until MY 1993.

A new turbocharger management system, Trionic 5 and later Trionic 7, was equipped from the 1993 model year onwards (the Trionic system used resistor spark plugs to detect for engine knock in place of the knock sensors incorporated into the engine block in the previous APC system).

For MY 1993 the model range was revised to provide some uniformity to the model designations on all markets. They became CS/CSE and CD/CDE:

- the CS / CD with basis equipment (which in principle already contained more equipment than the German competition in particular offered at the time)

- the CSE / CDE came with already most available equipment from factory

In principle, both equipment lines could be combined with the engines available in the respective MY. This means that even a "simple" CS could be ordered f.e. with the 200 hp turbo engine.

End of production:
As the 4 doors CD/E and the sporty Aero already expired after MY 1997, only 1400 of the Saab 9000 were produced for the last 1998 model year, and of these only 400 were exported to the United States, the main foreign market for Saab. Saab already concentrated on the successor of the Saab 9000, the Saab 9-5.

9000 CC (liftback) 
Originally known simply as the 9000, the original liftback variant was later given the CC identifier, standing for "Combi Coupe", to differentiate it from the CD ("Corps Diplomatique") sedan and later CS liftback. Saab also uses this different identifier for the Saab 900 versions. While originally equipped with an upright front design, this was replaced by the sloped version in MY 1990 that had earlier debuted on the 9000 CD (sedan) in 1988.

The original MY 1985 CC model (for this MY only available in Europe) was powered by an air-cooled, turbocharged, double overhead camshaft, 16-valve inline-four engine, providing 175 bhp without and 160 bhp with catalysator. Earlier on in the development, the PRV engine had also been considered. 
The 9000 became available in the US for MY 1986, and since MY 1987 onwards the turbo-charger became water-cooled. For MY 89 the CC with B202 turbo got the famous DI system which Saab introduced in the CD version one year before, raising the performance to 163 PS (161 hp) with cat.

As with the Saab 900 CC, the Saab 9000 CC had some special series in some countries, such as the "Saab 9000 turbo 16 SP" in France (SP stands for "Sport and Performance") with 185-204 hp with the B202 turbo engine, supplied by special control units and optimized fuel injection. In Germany and Switzerland there were also a special edition named "Saab 9000 Turbo 16 S", with an airflow kit and the B202 turbo with catalytic converter tuned up to 195 hp (for MY 1990), and for MY 1991 and 1992 (also available as CD with the new 195 hp B234 Turbo. But the most popular special series is the so-called "Talladega" (US and most parts of Europe) or "Carlsson"(UK), both models available as CC and CD (sedan) versions. The “Carlsson” takes its name from legendary Swedish rally ace Erik Carlsson, who secured numerous wins for Saab in the Sixties. In markets outside the UK, it was known as the Talladega in honour of the 19 endurance records set by three standard turbocharged 9000s at Talladega Speedway in the US in 1986. Since MY 1988 it was available both with and without catalytic converter. Saab had scared the power to 175 PS (160 original) in the catalytic converter engine and 192 PS (175 original) in non-cat. The pressure was around 1.0 bar. Furthermore, a new "black box" (APC) had been installed in the "Talladegas" which allows higher power. The "Carlsson" was produced from MY 1990 to 1992 (changing from CC to CS design) with engine output up to 225 PS and can be described as the precursor of the further Aero, which was introduced in MY 1993 with the CS design. A number of the Carlsson editions fitted with the B202 turbocharged engine were sold into the Australian market. 
All four series, the "SP 16" (France), "Turbo 16 S" (Germany, Switzerland), "Talladega" (Europe, US) and "Carlsson" are rare items sought today from Saab fans around the world. Unfortunately many of the few remaining specimens are often not in good condition.

Total production numbers as 5 door variant Saab 9000 CC: 
216,385 Saab 9000 CC (MY 1985-1991) (43% of all produced Saab 9000)

9000 CD (sedan) 

The Saab 9000 CD Sedan model was presented in Nice in January 1988. The CD was the four-door sedan body style with from beginning a slightly more aerodynamic nose which the CC get not until MY 1991. Just as in the launch of the CC variant, the 9000 CD was initially available only with the B202 turbo engine, but Saab combined it right from the start with its new "DI ignition system"  At the Birmingham Motor Show in September 1988, Saab premiered the non-turbo model of the CD with the naturally aspirated 2.0-litre inline-four. For MY 1990 Saab introduced the  2.3-litre B234 normally aspirated engine for both body shapes, the CC and CD. Since then the CD was available with the same basic engines as the CC for all MY (except the 225 PS "Aero" engine). The CD kept its old front and back till MY 1994, when Saab redesigned the CD for the first time since its start now wearing the front and back similar to the CS. The sedan was phased out after MY 1997.

From the beginning, Saab had placed the CD above the hatchback model in terms of equipment and price. This was in keeping with the spirit of the times, which saw an expensive notchback model more as a car for business people (with or without a chauffeur) who did not need the cargo space of the CC. This is why Saab never offered the CD with a folding rear seat, which would have been at the expense of stability and peace and quiet in the interior. 
With the introduction of the Saab 9000 2.3 Turbo CD "Griffin" for MY 1992 as the top model of the 9000 series, Saab finally placed itself in the luxury class. The Griffin in the limited edition of 400 pieces was only available in the form of the CD and only with the 2.3 Turbo engine.

The V6 was discontinued in the United States after one year along with the CDE model, but continued on in Europe until 1997. In some European markets, Saab revived the special model "Griffin" for MY 1995 onwards. It was only available with the V6 engine, automatic transmission and with numerous luxury appointments, such as an optional second air conditioning unit in the boot for the rear occupants and with all available electric options, special eucalyptus green paint, a separate rear-seat air conditioning system, walnut trim and rear window blinds.

Total production numbers of the 4-door Saab 9000 CD/CDE: 
112,177 Saab 9000 CD (MY 1988-1997) (22.3% of all produced Saab 9000)

9000 CS (liftback) 

Saab presented the 9000 CS (Combi Sedan), an updated version of the former CC liftback body variant, in Europe in autumn 1991 for the 1992 model year (in the US the CS starts in MY 1993). This replaced the CC. Featuring a lowered front fascia with new headlights, new grille, some minor changes at the doors and a substantially redesigned rear-end. Although the interior design remained basically the same, there were some changes in detail.

Here is an overview over the different versions of the different engine types used in the Saab 9000 CS Versions.

After the old B202 engine phased out after MY 1993, there were in summary 9 different engine versions for the CS available in the upcoming years. 
After the 1995 model year, both the naturally aspirated four-cylinder engines were discontinued in the United States.

A limited edition Anniversary model was introduced 1997 to mark Saab's 50th anniversary, featuring leather seats embossed with the classic, aircraft-inspired Saab logo and a colour-keyed body kit. The engine type was freely selectable from the available turbo engines of MY 1997 except the Aero engine with 225 PS. The "Anniversary" could be ordered until the end of the 9000 production in 1998. In the last MY 1998 the "Anniversary" could be also ordered with the 225 PS engine.

The Saab 9000 CS Aero was introduced in MY 1993. The predecessor was (in some European markets) the "Saab 9000 CS 2.3 16 S" in MY 1992 with the "normal" B234 turbo engine and 195 PS, but with special textile/leather seats, sporty styling and generous equipment. Revealed at the Paris Salon in October 1992 for MY 1993, then the new 9000 Aero was the fastest Saab to date and an exclusive interior and exterior. It was powered by a  version of Saab's 2.3-litre B234 engine, with more power courtesy of a larger Mitsubishi TD04 turbocharger. Aeros were equipped with paint-matched body kit and spoiler, eight-way Recaro-designed heated sports seats, a sport suspension, and 16-inch Super Aero wheels. The Aero's in-gear acceleration was strongly emphasised, and period advertising boasted, “The 5-speed Saab 9000 Aero will streak from 50 to 75 mph faster than a Ferrari Testarossa or a Porsche Carrera 4.” The Aero was discontinued after model year 1997, so in the last MY 1998 the 225 PS engine was available for all Saab 9000.

Total production numbers of the Saab 9000 CS/CSE type: 
174,525 Saab 9000 CS (MY 1992-1998) (34,7% of all produced Saab 9000)

Convertible (prototype) 

A convertible version was constructed by Finnish Valmet, the prototype version is currently on display at the Uusikaupunki car museum near the Valmet factory. Other experiments included fitting of the Yamaha developed V6 engine most famously fitted to the Ford Taurus SHO. This was vetoed by Saab-Scania, Saab's owner at the time, as was the fitting of a VM Motori diesel engine which had been executed with the aim of increasing Saab's sales in central and southern Europe. A station wagon was never truly under consideration due to the expenses involved, not in the least out of concern for the often tiny Saab importers who were thereby saved the trouble of having to keep a larger inventory.

Prometheus (prototype) 
In 1993, Saab experimented with steer-by-wire technology as part of the pan-European programme "Prometheus" (Programme for European Traffic with Highest Efficiency and Unprecedented Safety). Their contribution to the programme consisted of a modified 9000 with the steering wheel replaced with a center-mounted joystick. This setup removed the risk of body and facial injury in the event of an accident. It also provided easier and cheaper airbag installation, as well as improved instrument panel visibility. This prototype was tested by Jeremy Clarkson in an episode of Top Gear; the segment was revisited in Series 18, Episode 5 of the current Top Gear series, where Clarkson and James May paid tribute to the fallen automotive marque.

MPV (prototype) 
At a visit to the American Sunroof Company, who helped design the Saab 900 convertible, the engineers spotted the building of a minivan based on the Chrysler's K-car (later launched as Chrysler Voyager). Gunnar Larsson thought it was a neat idea and when he came home he asked the head of bodyworks Dick Ohlsson if they could do something like that based on the Saab 9000. "No problem", was the reply and a small team started working on it in secret. They used the 9000 platform but lengthened and with higher roof and room for seven persons (even if the rear seat was mostly suitable for children). The full-scale model was finished in May 1985, two months after the idea was first mooted.

Saab 9000 Limousine 
British coachbuilder Coleman & Milne extended several Saab 9000s into stretch limousine versions.

Also, motoring presenter James May created a stretch limousine from a Saab 9000 and its Alfa Romeo 164 relative, as part of a challenge for an episode of BBC's Top Gear.

Engines 
The Saab 9000 was available with a big variety of naturally-aspirated and turbocharged engines. The range consisted mostly of the Saab 2.0 and 2.3 litre engines, but there was also the 3.0-liter V6 made by Isuzu. One model was fitted with a prototype Saab V8 engine.

After the facelift in MY 1992 and as of MY 1993 (in most markets) the new introduced two equipment series CS/CD and CSE/CDE could be combined with all available engines in the respective MY. This means that even a "simple" equipped CS could be ordered with the most powerful 200 HP turbo engine. The face lifted CS models and furthermore "old fashioned" CD were available in MY 1992 in most countries with the same four engines which had also powered the former CC:
- the old B202 with and without turbo, both known from the classic Saab 900
- the B234 with and without turbo
This changed for MY 1993: on most international markets a 2.0l light pressure turbo (LPT), called B204 engine with also two balance shafts (like in the B234), became available on both CS and CD models giving 150 hp. In these markets, this LPT engine gradually replaced the 2.3l engine without turbo. Because Saab did not introduce the 2.0l LPT in the U.S., the LPT concept did not enter the U.S. market until 1994 with the 2.3 LPT (delivering 170 hp), based on a re-designed B234 engine. Since then, the Saab 9000 has only been available in the U.S. with the three 2.3l turbo engines:
2.3l LPT: 170 hp
2.3l FPT: 200 hp
2.3l Aero: 225 hp
The Saab 9000 with this LPT engine had the best fuel economy of any large car in the U.S. in MY 1995. 
The background of the new B204 and re-designed B234 engine was that Saab needed a suitable engine for the upcoming new Saab 900/2. Since Saab was always under high cost pressure, the new B204 were designed to fit both the new Saab 900/2 and the Saab 9000. So the new B234 without turbo (150 hp) and the B204 without turbo (133 hp) and as LPT (154 hp) and FPT (185 hp) was used in both the Saab 9000 and Saab 900 NG.
So worth paying attention to there were two generations of B234 engine in the Saab 9000, one made from MY 1990-1993 (called "long block"), the other from 1994 to 1998 ("short block"). The later motors had a revised oil sump system, head, timing cover, and different bell housing pattern.

Therefore, over the years three different engine types developed from Saab itself were available for the 9000: B202/B204/B234 (with the old B202 phased out on all markets for at the latest MY 1994). The B204 and B234 both came as non-turbos and turbo variants which additionally split in so called LPT (low pressure turbo) and FPT (full pressure turbo). Till MY 1995 the LPT had the designation "Ecopower" on the cylinder head in some markets. From MY 1996 Saab used this designation "EcoPower" for all turbo engines and in general for the Saab turbo concept. This allows the boost pressure to be increased as the ECU sees fit. Maximum stock boost on a full pressure turbo varies from  depending on the year and transmission. This is also the reason why every LPT can also be subsequently made into an FPT or even higher performances can be achieved. There are official tuning kits for this purpose as well as do-it-yourself instructions (recommended for experienced mechanics only!).

For MY 1995 a 210 hp three-litre V6, originating from General Motors and also found on the Opel (and Vauxhall) Omega, was introduced.
For MY 1996 the name “Ecopower” was now applied to all turbo engines regardless of FPT or LPT variants. The 2.3 litre injection engine (without turbo) phased out.

Production figures

References

Bibliography

External links 

9000
Cars introduced in 1984
1990s cars
Executive cars
Flagship vehicles
Front-wheel-drive vehicles
Hatchbacks
Sedans
Cars discontinued in 1998